Stevenson-Frink Farm is a historic farm complex located at Hounsfield in Jefferson County, New York. The farm complex consists of the stucco-covered concrete block farmhouse built in 1917–1918, its contemporary garage and four earlier contributing agriculture related outbuildings: a stone smokehouse, a former stable/carriage barn, a cattle barn, and granary.  Also on the property is a contributing house site.

It was listed on the National Register of Historic Places in 1989.

References

Houses on the National Register of Historic Places in New York (state)
Houses completed in 1917
Houses in Jefferson County, New York
National Register of Historic Places in Jefferson County, New York